BRP Gregorio del Pilar has been the name of more than one Philippine Navy ship, and may refer to:

Philippine Navy ship names